The Chhatrapati Shivaji Maharaj Terminus – Jalna Jan Shatabdi is a day train (as it returns to the station of origin on the same day). It connects the historical city of Aurangabad to the state capital Mumbai though the actual origination station was extended to Jalna in August 2015. The Jan Shatabdi Express is the fastest and most comfortable train option from Aurangabad to Mumbai.

Etymology
The name 'Jan' means people in Sanskrit language (and hence in many other Indian languages), hence this version of Shatabdi is meant for the ordinary people. Jan Shatabdi is an inter-city superfast train connecting major metropolitan cities, at low price. This train can be considered a 'down-scale' version of Shatabdi trains.

Jalna Jan Shatabdi
12071/72 – Jalna Jan Shatabdi runs between Dadar and Jalna. It is a daily Super Fast offered by the Central Railway. It had been extended to Mumbai CSMT. As per the time table effective 1 July 2013, it has been reverted to Dadar & now shares its rake with the 12051/52 Dadar Madgaon JanShatabdi Express. The train initially used to terminate at Aurangabad but w.e.f. August 9, 2015 it has been extended to Jalna.

En route it halts at Aurangabad, Manmad Junction, Nasik Road, Kalyan Junction and Thane. But it also stops at Kasara and Igatpuri as operational stops.

On the return journey the train is numbered 12071 and departs from Dadar at 1400 hrs and arrives at Jalna at 2140 hrs.

The Jalna Jan shatabdi is a fourteen-coach train and has ten Jan shatabdi class chair cars, two AC chair car and 2 luggage-cum-brake vans as part of its seating configuration.

Locomotion
As the route is not completely electrified, a Kalyan based WDP-4D hauls the train end to end.

Gallery

References

External links

Transport in Mumbai
Jan Shatabdi Express trains
Rail transport in Maharashtra
Railway services introduced in 2007
Transport in Aurangabad, Maharashtra
Transport in Jalna